Paulina Marcela Urrutia Fernández (born 15 January 1969) is a Chilean actress, academic, director, trade union leader, and politician. She was a State Minister of the first government of President Michelle Bachelet.

Biography
Born into a middle-class family, Paulina Urrutia grew up in the San Miguel district of the Chilean capital. Her parents worked in public administration and separated when she was fifteen years old. She studied at the Company of Mary school on Seminario Street in the municipality of Providencia.

Her first introduction to theater was as a girl, in a school workshop. Later, after graduating from high school, she entered the discipline at the Pontifical Catholic University of Chile.

The exercise of her profession began very early. Her career in television began in a Televisión Nacional de Chile (TVN) series in 1989, thanks to an invitation from the producer . She played, with great success, Juanita Fernández Solar, who was later declared the first Chilean saint under the name Teresa of the Andes.

In 1994, after starring in the television series , she joined the Television Corporation of the Catholic University of Chile (UC TV), where she remained until 2002. Her film debut came in 1993, in the movie Johnny 100 Pesos by local filmmaker Gustavo Graef Marino.

Urrutia quickly became involved in the political world by actively participating in the Chilean Actors Union (Sidarte), becoming its general secretary and its president in 2001. During the first government of Michelle Bachelet, she was appointed president of the National Council of Culture and the Arts in 2006. This is equivalent to the position of culture minister in other countries.

Under her administration as minister, a set of reforms to intellectual property law was drafted and discussed. It was approved unanimously by the National Congress on 13 January 2010, and promulgated as Law No. 20,435 on 4 May of that year, during the government of Sebastián Piñera.

In May 2017 she assumed the direction of the Camilo Henríquez Theater, succeeding the playwright Ramón Griffero.

Urrutia is married to journalist, producer, and director Augusto Góngora. Gongora has been diagnosed with Alzheimer disease since 2014. She has no children, but two step-children with him. Between 2018 and 2022 the chilenische film maker Maite Alberdi followed the couple in and outside their home to create a full-length documentary film, The Eternal Memory, showing how they coped with Góngora's illness in daily life. The film was awarded the World Cinema Grand Jury Prize: Documentary at the 2023 Sundance Film Festival and had its European premiere in the Panorama Section at the 73rd Berlin International Film Festival in February 2023.

Filmography

Film

Telenovelas

TV series

Theater
  (1987), by Jacobo Langsner, Theater of the Catholic University of Chile, dir.: Raúl Osorio
 El paseo de Buster Keaton (1988), assembly of three pieces by Federico García Lorca for the director Aldo Parodi, La Memoria Theater Company
 La Tierra no es redonda (1989), staged by Alfredo Castro, based on El libro de Cristóbal Colón by Paul Claudel, La Memoria Theater Company
 Los días tuertos (1993), La Memoria Theater Company
 El seductor (1996), by Benjamín Galemiri
 La misión (1997), by Heiner Müller 
 Máquina Hamlet (1999), by Heiner Müller
 Cinema-Uttopia (2000), by Ramón Griffero
 Todos saben quién fue (2001), by Alejandro Moreno
 Devastados (2002), by Sarah Kane, dir.: Alfredo Castro
 La amante fascista, by Alejandro Chato Moreno, in the role of Iris Rojas, La Palabra Theater Company, 2010; Camilo Henríquez Theater, 2017, under the direction of 
 Tus deseos en fragmentos (2012), by Ramón Griffero, Fin de Siglo Theater
 Prometeo, el origen (2015), by Ramón Griffero, Camilo Henríquez Theater
 99 La Morgue (2017), by Ramón Griffero, directed by the author, Camilo Henríquez Theater

Music videos

Awards

APES
 1990,  Award for Best Television Actress for 
 1993, APES Award for Best Film Actress for Johnny 100 Pesos

Altazor
 2000, Altazor Award in Audiovisual Arts as Best Television Actress for 
 2003, Altazor Award in Performing Arts as Best Theater Actress for Devastados
 2011, Altazor Award in Performing Arts as Best Theater Actress for La amante fascista

International Festival of Trieste, Italy
 2007, Best Performance for the film Tendida, mirando las estrellas

Caleuche
 2016, Caleuche Award for Best Supporting Actress in the series

References

External links

 

1969 births
Actresses from Santiago
Chilean agnostics
Chilean film actresses
Chilean people of Basque descent
Chilean stage actresses
Chilean telenovela actresses
Culture ministers
Government ministers of Chile
Living people
Pontifical Catholic University of Chile alumni
Women government ministers of Chile
21st-century Chilean women politicians
20th-century Chilean actresses
21st-century Chilean actresses
Chilean actor-politicians